Icy Bay (Tlingit: Lig̲aasi Áa) is a body of water in the borough of Yakutat, Alaska, formed in the last 100 years by the rapid retreat of the Guyot, Yahtse, and Tyndall Glaciers.  It is part of the Wrangell-Saint Elias Wilderness.

At the beginning of the 20th century, the bay entrance was permanently blocked by a giant tidewater glacier face that calved icebergs directly into the Gulf of Alaska.

Icy Bay is a popular destination for sea kayakers, and is reachable by bush plane from Yakutat, Alaska.

2015 landslide and megatsunami
At 8:19 p.m. Alaska Daylight Time on 17 October 2015, the side of a mountain collapsed on the western end of the head of Taan Fiord, a finger of Icy Bay formed by the retreat of Tyndall Glacier. The resulting landslide generated a megatsunami in Taan Fjord. The area is uninhabited and no one was visiting it at the time, and the event went undetected for several hours until its signature was noted as a 4.9 magnitude event on seismograms at Columbia University in New York City.

Scientists visited the fjord in the spring and summer of 2016 to gather data on the event. Altogether, the landslide debris covered .

The Taan Fiord event bore a strong similarity to the July 1958 landslide and megatsunami in Alaska's Lituya Bay. The Taan Fiord landslide was the largest recorded in North America since the eruption of Mount St. Helens in May 1980, and the largest non-volcanic landslide in North America ever recorded. The megatsunami was the largest known marine tsunami worldwide since the Lituya Bay wave; although the Taan Fiord landslide was larger than the one at Lituya Bay, the Lituya Bay wave was larger than the one in Taan Fiord because the landslide in Taan Fiord did not fall from as great a height and landed in shallower water. The Taan Fiord wave also was the fourth-largest megatsunami of any type over the previous 100 years, with the fourth-highest run-up ever recorded anywhere in the world.

References

External links
Sea Kayaking in Icy Bay
Official National Park Service website

Fjords of Alaska
Bodies of water of Yakutat City and Borough, Alaska
Tourist attractions in Yakutat City and Borough, Alaska
Megatsunamis